RalBP1-associated Eps domain-containing protein 1 is a protein that in humans is encoded by the REPS1 gene.

References

Further reading

EH-domain-containing proteins